These are the official results of the Men's 400 metres Hurdles event at the 1995 IAAF World Championships in Gothenburg, Sweden. There were a total number of 54 participating athletes, with seven qualifying heats, two semi-finals and the final held on Thursday 1995-08-10.

Final

Semi-finals
Held on Tuesday 1993-08-08

Qualifying heats
Held on Monday 1995-08-07

See also
 1992 Men's Olympic 400m Hurdles (Barcelona)
 1994 Men's European Championships 400m Hurdles (Helsinki)
 1996 Men's Olympic 400m Hurdles (Atlanta)
 1998 Men's European Championships 400m Hurdles (Budapest)

References
 Results

H
400 metres hurdles at the World Athletics Championships